McColl's Retail Group is a British convenience shop and newsagent operator, trading under the trading names Morrisons Daily and McColl's (for convenience stores), Martin's (newsagents and pound shops) and RS McColl for some stores in Scotland. McColl's also operates post offices in several stores.

History

Martin McColl 

In 1998, TM Retail acquired the Martin's and RS McColl's chain of newsagents.

In 2006, TM Retail was renamed Martin McColl Limited after a management buyout, with the various stores rebranded as Martin's (for the news and variety stores) or McColl's (for the convenience stores) and the stores in Scotland retaining the RS McColl name.

From 2009 to 2010, Martin McColl Limited replaced their existing EPOS system with a new multi-screen touch screen system. It was hoped this would speed up the transaction process by incorporating Credit/Debit card systems within the EPOS. The multi-screen system allows advertising POS to be electronically displayed to customers during the time that they are at the till. By 2011, an expansion for the new system had been developed, with the addition of built-in PayPoint terminals known as PPOD.

During 2012 to 2013, a barcode system was implemented to scan lottery tickets through the till making transactions more accurate and reducing the chances of human error. Martin McColl began another rebrand making the stores more appealing to customers and changed their POS format to go with the new brand.

In March 2013, Martin McColl's implemented a company-wide change in the colouring of SEL's and POS, opting for 'ivory' SEL strips and a mixture of block-coloured red and white POS material.

In August 2013, the group changed its name from Martin McColl Retail Group to McColls Retail Group.

The company was floated on the stock market in January 2014. In July 2016, wholly owned subsidiary, Martin McColl Ltd, announced it would acquire 298 shops from The Co-operative Group (subject to Competition & Markets Authority approval) for £117 million. In 2022, McColl's was placed in voluntary administration and purchased by Morrisons.

Morrisons takeover
After having Morrisons' Safeway brand on around 400 product lines in over 1,300 stores since January 2018, McColl's decided to take the wholesale agreement further by having 350 of their convenience stores rebranded from McColl’s to Morrisons Daily. The first rebranded stores were operating at the start of 2021, with the 100th rebranded store opening in Ellesmere Port in October 2021. A total of 185 stores had been converted to Morrisons Daily by the end of 2021. McColl's hoped to have 350 shops trading under the new format by the end of 2022.

In 2021, McColl's raised £30m to invest in the expansion of its Morrisons Daily convenience stores. The income of the convenience stores had been reduced by the coronavirus pandemic. McColl's was reported to have £170m of debt by BBC News, while The Guardian reported a lower figure of £100m of debt.

On 6 May 2022, McColl's was reported to be on the verge of financial collapse. The retailer said it was "increasingly likely" it would fall into administration unless a rescue deal were successful. The company reported that it would "be placed into administration with the objective of achieving a sale of the group to a third-party purchaser and securing the interests of creditors and employees". Earlier in the week, the listed company warned that its shares would be suspended as it was not able to meet the deadline for filing its annual results.

On 6 May 2022, it was announced that the company would enter voluntary administration after talks with Morrisons about a rescue deal failed. PricewaterhouseCoopers was appointed as administrator. At the time of the announcement, the McColl's website listed a total of 1149 stores, with 755 branded McColl's, 270 branded Morrisons Daily, 116 branded Martin's and eight branded RS McColl. On 9 May, Morrisons agreed terms with the administrator to acquire McColl's in a pre-packaged insolvency arrangement. 

On 30 May 2022, the Competition and Markets Authority (CMA) announced it was launching an investigation into Morrison's acquisition of McColl's due to competition concerns, ordering Morrison's to run McColl's as a separate company while the investigation is being carried out.

On 13 July 2022, the CMA announced it had launched a formal investigation into Morrison's acquisition of McColl's. On 15 July 2022, Morrison's announced it had agreed to rescue McColl's pension scheme following the acquisition.

On 9 September 2022, the CMA announced it had largely cleared Morrison's acquisition of McColl's, raising concerns in 35 local areas where both brands would face reduced competition if the takeover went ahead as planned. Morrisons was then given five days to offer proposals to the CMA to address the concerns identified. On 23 September 2022, Morrisons said it was offering to divest the overlapping convenience stores to ease the CMA's concerns, which the CMA said it would accept.

On 10 October 2022, Morrisons announced it planned to sell 28 McColl's stores (26 stores in England, 1 store in Scotland and 1 store in Wales) to a purchaser or purchasers approved by the CMA due to competition concerns. The CMA said it was consulting on the proposals for selling the stores.

On 27 October 2022, the CMA announced it would not be escalating its investigation and had cleared Morrisons' acquisition of McColl's, accepting Morrisons' plan to sell 28 McColl's stores.

On 1 November 2022, Morrisons announced it would close 132 loss-making McColl's stores (putting 1,300 jobs at risk) over the remainder of the year, and convert the remaining McColl's stores into Morrisons Daily stores within the next two to three years, bringing the number of Morrisons Daily stores to more than 1,000. Morrison's convenience, online and wholesale director Joseph Sutton will take charge of McColl's from McColl's interim CEO Karen Bird and CFO Giles David. Affected employees will be offered jobs in other local Morrisons stores or other parts of the Morrisons business.

Criticism
In November 2014, after a number of robberies in Wirral, including one in which a manager was knocked out, McColl's was fined £150,000 and ordered to pay £78,000 prosecution costs for failing to protect its staff.

In August 2021, McColl's was "named and shamed" by the UK government for not paying workers the minimum wage.

References

External links
 

1973 establishments in the United Kingdom
2022 mergers and acquisitions
Companies formerly listed on the London Stock Exchange
Convenience stores
Retail companies established in 1973
Retail companies of the United Kingdom
Supermarkets of the United Kingdom